Saint-Julien-le-Pauvre, in full Église Saint-Julien-le-Pauvre (French for Church of Saint Julian the Poor), is a Melkite Greek Catholic parish church in Paris, France, and one of the city's oldest religious buildings. Begun in Romanesque style during the 12th century, with 13th century High Gothic additions, it is situated in the 5th arrondissement, on the Left Bank of the Seine River, about 500 meters away from the Musée de Cluny and in the proximity of the Maubert-Mutualité Paris Métro station. It shares a city block with the Square René Viviani.

Originally a Roman Catholic place of worship, Saint-Julien-le-Pauvre was built in stages from the 12th to the 19th centuries, and granted to the Eastern Catholic Melkite community in 1889. Its design was modified several times, and the resulting church is significantly smaller in size than originally planned.

Name
The church was dedicated to two medieval French saints of the same name: Julian of Le Mans and a figure from the region of Dauphiné. "The poor" is said to originate from Julian of Le Mans, whose dedication to the cause of the poor was considered exemplary.

History

Saint-Julien-le-Pauvre replaced a 6th-century oratory dedicated to Saint Julien de Broude, which was part of a Merovingian hospice which sheltered pilgrims without funds.

The earliest mention of such a site was found in texts authored by Gregory, bishop of Tours, who resided there in the 6th century during the rule of Chilperic I, king of Neustria. A synagogue serving the Jewish residents, probably the oldest in the city, was located in its environs. The buildings were badly damaged in the 9th century during the Norman invasion. In about 1120 the building was ceded to the monks of Clunisian order from the Abbey of Longpoint. It first took the name of Julian of Le Mans, the first bishop of Mans, then later was dedicated to Saint Julian the Hospitaller.

The new church was begun between 1165 and 1170 upon the foundations of the older church. It was built under King Louis VII, the founder of the University of Paris, and of Notre-Dame de Paris. It was inspired by its contemporary, Notre Dame de Paris  or the Saint Pierre de Montmartre church, The building effort was supported by the Clunaic monastic community of Longpont. Their enterprise resulted in the completion of the choir and, most likely, the nave (ca. 1210–1220).

Saint-Julien-le-Pauvre was designed in the conservative tradition prevalent during the rule of King Louis the Younger. The only one of the city's twelfth-century parish churches to have endured, it was never completed in its original design: the choir area was intended to be three stories high, and the clerestory is an incomplete triforium; the nave was supposed to be covered by sexpartite vaults, which were replaced by a wooden roof and, after the 17th century, by a new system of vaults; and, of a tower meant to stand on the church's southern side, only the staircase was begun. The eastern apses use material from an older building.

The church was closely associated with the nearby School of the Cathedral of Notre-Dame, and then University of Paris, or Sorbonne College whose charter was confirmed by the Pope in 1215. For three centuries the parishioners of the church included the students and the eminent scholars of the university, including Dante and Thomas Aquinas, and the church was used as the meeting place for college assemblies.

In the 17th century Cardinal Richelieu transferred the Sorbonne to a new campus and built a new chapel. the Saint Julien church entered a long decline. Two of the original bays in the nave were demolished, and a northwestern facade was added. The northern aisle was preserved, and two of its bays serves as a sacristy. In 1655 the church was downgraded to the status of a simple parish church.

During the French Revolution, the church was closed and building was used as a storage depot for salt. It was isted for demolition, and suffered more damage as a result. The building was not returned to the Catholic Church until 1826. It underwent restoration under the direction of architect Franz Christian Gau.

In 1889 the church was assigned to the worshippers of the Melkite Greek Catholic Church, dependent upon the Patriarch of Antioch. The boiling was modified, with the addition of icons and an iconostasis between the choir and nave, the accommodate the new worshippers.

The Dada performance piece
On April 14, 1921, Saint-Julien-le-Pauvre was a venue for one of the last major performance art experiments in the history of the Dada avant-garde trend. Deemed a "Dada excursion", the event involved writers Tristan Tzara, André Breton, Philippe Soupault, as well as artist Francis Picabia. The group printed a pamphlet which read: "Today, at 15:00 hours, in the garden of St-Julien-le-Pauvre church, Dada [...] extends a free invitation to its friends and enemies to join it in visiting the church's buildings. It will not be an anticlerical demonstration, as one would be inclined to believe, but rather a new interpretation of nature applied this time not to art, but to life." As they distributed copies, they shouted insulting or provocative slogans to passers-by: "Be dirty!... One must trim his nose as one trims his hair!... One must wash her breasts like she washes facecloths..."

The "Dada excursion", conceived as a manner to revive the public's awareness of Dada, failed to gain needed attention, and, together with a mock trial of reactionary writer Maurice Barrès held later in the year, helped create a rift between Tzara's group and the future Surrealists Breton and Picabia.

Exterior 

The west front of the church varies by 30 degrees from true west, about the same variation as Notre Dame dw Paris; probably both churches were aligned to face the setting sun in mid-summer. Some of the original columns and columns from the early Romanesque church, with vegetal sculpture, are still visible near the west front. Vestiges of the gallery of the west facade are also still visible, as well as the rows of buttresses from the 12th century which still support the outer walls of the nave.

Interior 

The influence of Notre-Dame-de-Paris, built at the same time, is visible in the architecture of the interior of the church, particularly in the vaults and the columns and pillars in the nave and choir. The 13th-century nave is flanked by two lower aisles. and lined with arcades of columns supporting pointed arches. The columns have capitals decorated with sculpted water lilies and other aquatic plants. The choir is older (12th century) and is a good example of the early Gothic style. It is covered with early six-part rib vaults, while the nave has the simpler, stronger four-part vaults. One 12th century column is decorated with sculptures of harpies, mythical half-woman, half-bird creatures popular in Romanesque architecture.

The interior of the church underwent extensive modification in the 19th century to adapt it to its role as a church of the Greek Melkite Catholic Church. These include the addition of an iconostasis and icons; the removal of statues, with the exception of one statue from the earlier Roman church; and the removal of the church organ. The iconostasis symbolizes the border between the nave, the human, visible world, and the sanctuary, the imvisible, sacred world. The current iconostasis was created in 1890 of carved woodwork by Georges BItar, an artist from Damascus.

Art and Decoration

The building has piers replicating those found in Notre Dame, and the chapiters are carved with images of leaves and harpies. The choir area is covered by an iconostasis.

North of the church, in the Square René Viviani, is found the oldest tree in Paris. It is a locust tree planted in 1602 by Jean Robin, gardener-in-chief during the reign of kings Henry III, Henry IV, and Louis XIII. Also known as the "Lucky Tree of Paris", it is thought to bring years of good luck to those who gently touch the tree's bark.

See also
List of historic churches in Paris

References

Bibliography 
Dumoulin, Aline; Ardisson, Alexandra; Maingard, Jérôme; Antonello, Murielle; Églises de Paris (2010), Éditions Massin, Issy-Les-Moulineaux, 
Lecompte, Francis and Ladoux, Bernard, "Paris Rive Gauche – Quartier Latin, St, Germain des Prés, Montparnasse – Les Essentials du Patrimoine", Éditions Massin, Paris,

External links

  Description of the church at Patrimoine Paris.fr (in French)
 

Greek Catholic churches in Paris
Lebanese diaspora in France
Roman Catholic churches in the 5th arrondissement of Paris
Melkite Greek Catholic churches
Gothic architecture in Paris
Eastern Catholic churches in France